Os Filhos do Rock is a Portuguese television series broadcast by RTP and set in the Portuguese rock scene of the 1980s. It has 26 episodes and aired from 8 December 2013 to 7 June 2014 on RTP1.

Cast
Albano Jerónimo
Ivo Canelas
Isabel Abreu
Filipa Areosa

References

External links

2013 Portuguese television series debuts
2014 Portuguese television series endings
Portuguese historical television series
Rádio e Televisão de Portugal original programming
Television series set in the 1980s
2010s Portuguese television series